BFF Girls is a Brazilian girl group formed in the first season of the reality show The Voice Kids. Currently, the group is formed by Bia Torres, Giulia Nassa and Laura Castro. The original line-up included Laura Schadeck, who officially announced her departure in January 2019. The group owns the number one hit "Fica" on Billboard Brasil. The group is hired by Sony Music.

Biography and Career

Formed by Bia Torres, Giulia Nassa and Laura Schadeck after meeting on the TV show The Voice Kids in 2016 and 2017, the BFF Girls began their journey by covering national and international songs. The trio's YouTube channel entered the Top 10 of the highest number of views on Vevo in 2018, giving visibility to the copyright works that would follow.

In March 2018, the group released a series of copyright songs always accompanied by clips, such as "BFF", "Eu Shippo" and "Meu Crush". Hit by Brazilian teen pop, “Meu Crush” also won a Spanish version, written by Erika Ender, [6] winner of the Latin Grammy and co-author of the mega hit "Despacito", produced by Umberto Tavares. In January 2019, Laura Schadeck announced her departure, and Laura Castro stepped in.

In 2019, the trio released their first authorial EP, entitled "Nossa Vibe". The 3 unpublished tracks ("Minha Vibe", "Flashback" and "Com Você") presented also won clips with different scenarios, but that are part of the same narrative. Stop ”in the soundtrack of the Angry Birds 2 film and participated in the Vevo Live Performance, presenting the acoustic version of the hit“ Meu Crush ”and then launching“ Eu Sou ”, and to close the year," Fica "was released.

Discography

Extended plays (EPs)

Singles

Awards and nominations

References

Feminist musicians
Brazilian musical groups